Böyük Muruq (also, Bëyuk Murug and Beyuk-Murukh) is a village and municipality in the Qusar Rayon of Azerbaijan.  It has a population of 552.

References 

Populated places in Qusar District